Primetime 24 (PT24) was a special package offered on C band satellite sent out to viewers who mainly live in remote and distant locations. The package consisted of local ABC, CBS, NBC and Fox affiliates on the East Coast: The service was broadcast via the AMC-3 satellite, encrypted using DigiCipher 2. Until 2012, the service was owned by Lorac Communications, based in Collingwood, Ontario, Canada.

History
When Primetime 24 first started in 1992, the group originally consisted of:

 WABC-TV, New York City (ABC)
 WBBM-TV, Chicago (CBS)
 WXIA-TV, Atlanta (NBC)
 WFLD, Chicago (Fox)

In 1994, however, the two Chicago stations were replaced with WRAL-TV Raleigh, North Carolina for CBS and WSVN Miami for Fox; by 1997, PT24 dropped Fox, and WRAL, due to many pre-emptions of CBS programming, was replaced with WSEE-TV Erie, Pennsylvania, which was PT24's CBS affiliate for the remainder of the package's existence. WABC and WXIA still remained the ABC and NBC (respectively) affiliates for PT24 through 2008; however, for a time, WABC was replaced with WJLA-TV of Washington, D.C. and later WKRN-TV of Nashville, Tennessee; WXIA was replaced with WNBC of New York City, and later was replaced by WTVJ in Miami. WABC was dropped in favor of WPLG on January 1, 2009, and Fox was restored by adding WUTV of Buffalo, New York. W32DZ-D (Mayagüez, Puerto Rico) and WCVI-TV (Christiansted, U.S. Virgin Islands) replaced WSEE in the fall of 2019 after Lilly Broadcasting acquired the non-license assets of both stations, allowing CBS programs to be distributed over-the-air in those regions.

Other time zones
At one point, PT24 offered a package called "The Denver 5", featuring that city's KMGH-TV (ABC), KCNC-TV (CBS), KUSA (NBC), KDVR (Fox), and even a PBS station, KRMA. At one point, WB affiliate KWGN-TV was added to the mix.

Stations on the West Coast were also included in the late 1990s and early 2000s, featuring Seattle, Washington's KOMO-TV (ABC), San Francisco's KPIX-TV (CBS), and Los Angeles' KNBC (NBC).

Similar packages
 Netlink offered a network package called "A3" for a time that included WPLG (ABC), WUSA-TV Washington (CBS), and WBZ-TV Boston for NBC (later replaced with WHDH-TV, following the 1995 affiliation change).
 Before PT24 began, a package called "Atlantic Coast" was used, which included WPLG, WUSA and WBZ, plus WTXF-TV from Philadelphia for Fox.
 In the early days of direct broadcast satellite, many companies offered local channels on a nationwide basis, subject to FCC restrictions: PrimeStar offered WSB-TV Atlanta for ABC, plus WUSA, WHDH, WTXF and a national PBS service. West Coast channels included KABC-TV from Los Angeles for ABC, KOIN from Portland, Oregon for CBS, KCRA-TV from Sacramento for NBC, and KTVU from San Francisco for Fox. DirecTV offered WRAL-TV (Raleigh, North Carolina) and KPIX (San Francisco) for CBS, WNBC (New York) and KNBC (Los Angeles) for NBC, KOMO-TV (Seattle) and WJLA (Washington, D.C.) for ABC, and WNET (New York) for PBS.
 In the US, Dish Network and DirecTV still offer local channels nationally as well, where local service is not available terrestrially or on satellite. In Canada, Bell Satellite TV and Shaw Direct offer US networks on their services, as do most cable systems, though American commercial stations are subject to simultaneous substitution regulations.

External links
 Primetime 24 (official site)

Direct broadcast satellite services